The Mars Hill Lions are the athletic teams that represent Mars Hill University, located in Mars Hill, North Carolina, in NCAA Division II intercollegiate sports.

The Lions are full members of  the South Atlantic Conference, home to 18 of its 21 athletics programs. The men's and women's swimming programs are members of the single-sport Appalachian Swimming Conference, and the acrobatics and tumbling team is an associate member of Conference Carolinas.

Mars Hill have been members of the SAC since its founding in 1975.

Varsity teams

List of teams

Men's sports (10)
 Baseball
 Basketball
 Cross Country
 Esports
 Football
 Golf 
 Lacrosse
 Soccer
 Swimming
 Tennis
 Track and field

Women's sports (11)
 Acrobatics and tumbling
 Basketball
 Cross country
 Esports
 Golf
 Lacrosse
 Soccer
 Softball
 Swimming
 Tennis
 Track and field
 Volleyball

Individual teams

Cross country
The men's cross country team have also been highly successful over the last two decades; from 1997 to 2014 they won 18 straight conference championships; in 2016 they won their 19th conference championship. In 2014 the men's cross country team won the NCAA Division II Southeast Regional championship and advanced to the Division II national championship meet, and in 2015 they finished in second place in the Division II Southeast Regional championship and advanced to the Division II national meet. In June 2017, Nathan Jones, a member of the Mars Hill cross country team, won the South Atlantic Conference Man of the Year Award, and in 2018 Mars Hill baseball player Zac Brown won the SAC Man of the Year Award.

Football
In December 2011, Mars Hill running back Jonas Randolph won the prestigious Harlon Hill Trophy, which is given each year to the best player in NCAA Division II football.

Club sports

Cycling
In May 2011 the cycling team won the USA Cycling Collegiate Division II national championship. In 2012 they finished in second place nationally, and in May 2015 the Mars Hill cycling team finished the season ranked in first place nationally among Division II teams.

References

External links